The 2018 Toppserien is the 32nd season of the highest women's football league in Norway. LSK Kvinner entered the season as the defending champions.

LSK Kvinner won their fifth consecutive title with five matchdays to spare.

Teams

League table

Top scorers

Individual awards
At the end of the year Norwegian Football awards Guro Reiten of LSK Kvinner won the 2018 Golden Boot, 2018 Player of the Year and 2018 Goal of the Year awards.

References

External links
 Official website
 Fixtures and results
 Season on soccerway.com

Toppserien seasons
Top level Norwegian women's football league seasons
1
Norway
Norway